The 2010–11 Saint Mary's Gaels men's basketball team represented Saint Mary's College of California in the 2010–11 college basketball season. This was head coach Randy Bennett's tenth season at Saint Mary's. The Gaels competed in the West Coast Conference and played their home games at the McKeon Pavilion. They finished the season 25–9, 11–3 in WCC play to tie with Gonzaga for the regular season conference title. They advanced to the championship game of the 2011 West Coast Conference men's basketball tournament before losing to Gonzaga. As a regular season champion who failed to win their conference tournament, the Gaels earned an automatic bid in the 2011 National Invitation Tournament where they were upset in the first round by Kent State.

Roster
Source

Schedule and results
Source
All times are Pacific

|-
!colspan=9| Regular season

|-
!colspan=9| West Coast Conference tournament

|-
!colspan=9| Regular season (game added on 2/21/11)

|-
!colspan=9| 2011 NIT

References

Saint Mary's
Saint Mary's Gaels men's basketball seasons
Saint Mary's
Saint Mary's Gaels men's basketball
Saint Mary's Gaels men's basketball